The following is a partial list of the "D" codes for Medical Subject Headings (MeSH), as defined by the United States National Library of Medicine (NLM).

This list covers membrane proteins. For other protein-related codes, see List of MeSH codes (D12.776).

Codes before these are found at List of MeSH codes (D12.776) § MeSH D12.776.532.510.750. Codes following these are found at List of MeSH codes (D12.776) § MeSH D12.776.556. For other MeSH codes, see List of MeSH codes.

The source for this content is the set of 2006 MeSH Trees from the NLM.

– membrane proteins

– ankyrins

– arrestins

– arrestin

– bacterial outer membrane proteins

– adhesins, bacterial
 – adhesins, escherichia coli

– fimbriae proteins

– calnexin

– connexins

– connexin 43

– dystrophin

– dystrophin-associated proteins

– dystroglycans

– sarcoglycans

– ephrins

– ephrin-A1

– ephrin-A2

– ephrin-A3

– ephrin-A4

– ephrin-A5

– ephrin-B1

– ephrin-B2

– ephrin-B3

– heterotrimeric gtp-binding proteins

– gtp-binding protein alpha subunits
 – gtp-binding protein alpha subunits, g12-g13
 – gtp-binding protein alpha subunits, gi-go
 – gtp-binding protein alpha subunit, gi2
 – gtp-binding protein alpha subunits, gq-g11
 – gtp-binding protein alpha subunits, gs

– gtp-binding protein beta subunits

– gtp-binding protein gamma subunits

– transducin

– ldl-receptor related protein-associated protein

– membrane fusion proteins

– snare proteins
 – q-snare proteins
 – qa-snare proteins
 – syntaxin 1
 – syntaxin 16
 – qb-snare proteins
 – synaptosomal-associated protein 25
 – qc-snare proteins
 – synaptosomal-associated protein 25
 – r-snare proteins
 – vesicle-associated membrane protein 1
 – vesicle-associated membrane protein 2
 – vesicle-associated membrane protein 3

– viral fusion proteins
 – hiv envelope protein gp41

– membrane glycoproteins

– antigens, cd47

– antigens, cd55

– antigens, cd58

– antigens, cd59

– antigens, cd86

– antigens, cd147

– antigens, thy-1

– antiporters
 – anion exchange protein 1, erythrocyte
 – chloride-bicarbonate antiporters
 – anion exchange protein 1, erythrocyte
 – potassium-hydrogen antiporters
 – sodium-hydrogen antiporter

– atp-binding cassette transporters
 – p-glycoproteins
 – p-glycoprotein

– ca-15-3 antigen

– cd40 ligand

– cell adhesion molecules
 – antigens, cd22
 – antigens, cd24
 – antigens, cd31
 – antigens, cd146
 – antigens, cd164
 – cadherins
 – desmosomal cadherins
 – desmocollins
 – desmogleins
 – desmoglein 1
 – desmoglein 2
 – desmoglein 3
 – carcinoembryonic antigen
 – cd4 immunoadhesins
 – cell adhesion molecules, neuronal
 – cell adhesion molecules, neuron-glia
 – activated-leukocyte cell adhesion molecule
 – myelin p0 protein
 – neural cell adhesion molecules
 – antigens, cd56
 – neural cell adhesion molecule l1
 – integrin alphaxbeta2
 – intercellular adhesion molecule-1
 – receptors, lymphocyte homing
 – antigens, cd44
 – integrin alpha4beta1
 – lymphocyte function-associated antigen-1
 – l-selectin
 – selectins
 – e-selectin
 – l-selectin
 – p-selectin
 – vascular cell adhesion molecule-1

– fibronectins

– gap-43 protein

– ion channels
 – calcium channels
 – calcium channels, l-type
 – calcium channels, n-type
 – calcium channels, p-type
 – calcium channels, q-type
 – calcium channels, r-type
 – calcium channels, t-type
 – ryanodine receptor calcium release channel
 – chloride channels
 – cystic fibrosis transmembrane conductance regulator
 – porins
 – aquaporins
 – aquaglyceroporins
 – aquaporin 3
 – aquaporin 6
 – aquaporin 1
 – aquaporin 2
 – aquaporin 4
 – aquaporin 5
 – voltage-dependent anion channels
 – voltage-dependent anion channel 1
 – voltage-dependent anion channel 2
 – potassium channels
 – potassium channels, calcium-activated
 – intermediate-conductance calcium-activated potassium channels
 – large-conductance calcium-activated potassium channels
 – large-conductance calcium-activated potassium channel alpha subunits
 – large-conductance calcium-activated potassium channel beta subunits
 – small-conductance calcium-activated potassium channels
 – potassium channels, inwardly rectifying
 – g protein-coupled inwardly-rectifying potassium channels
 – potassium channels, tandem pore domain
 – potassium channels, voltage-gated
 – delayed rectifier potassium channels
 – kcnq potassium channels
 – kcnq1 potassium channel
 – kcnq2 potassium channel
 – kcnq3 potassium channel
 – kv1.1 potassium channel
 – kv1.2 potassium channel
 – kv1.3 potassium channel
 – kv1.5 potassium channel
 – kv1.6 potassium channel
 – shab potassium channels
 – ether-a-go-go potassium channels
 – shaker superfamily of potassium channels
 – kv1.1 potassium channel
 – kv1.2 potassium channel
 – kv1.4 potassium channel
 – kv1.5 potassium channel
 – shab potassium channels
 – shal potassium channels
 – shaw potassium channels
 – sodium channels
 – transient receptor potential channels

– kangai-1 protein

– laminin

– lysosome-associated membrane glycoproteins
 – lysosomal-associated membrane protein 1
 – lysosomal-associated membrane protein 2

– myelin-associated glycoprotein

– platelet membrane glycoproteins
 – antigens, cd36
 – integrin alpha2beta1
 – integrin alpha5beta1
 – integrin alpha6beta1
 – integrin alphavbeta3
 – lysosomal-associated membrane protein 1
 – platelet glycoprotein gpib-ix complex
 – platelet glycoprotein gpiib-iiia complex
 – receptors, thrombin
 – platelet glycoprotein gpib-ix complex
 – receptor, par-1
 – thrombomodulin
 – p-selectin

– sarcoglycans

– synaptophysin

– thrombospondins
 – thrombospondin 1

– variant surface glycoproteins, trypanosoma

– membrane transport proteins

– atp-binding cassette transporters
 – multidrug resistance-associated proteins
 – p-glycoproteins
 – p-glycoprotein

– amino acid transport systems
 – amino acid transport systems, acidic
 – amino acid transport system x-ag
 – glutamate plasma membrane transport proteins
 – excitatory amino acid transporter 1
 – excitatory amino acid transporter 2
 – excitatory amino acid transporter 3
 – excitatory amino acid transporter 4
 – excitatory amino acid transporter 5
 – amino acid transport systems, basic
 – amino acid transport system y+
 – cationic amino acid transporter 1
 – cationic amino acid transporter 2
 – amino acid transport system y+l
 – antigens, cd98
 – antigens, cd98 heavy chain
 – antigens, cd98 light chains
 – amino acid transport systems, neutral
 – amino acid transport system a
 – amino acid transport system asc
 – amino acid transport system l
 – antigens, cd98
 – antigens, cd98 heavy chain
 – antigens, cd98 light chains
 – large neutral amino acid-transporter 1
 – glycine plasma membrane transport proteins

– fatty acid transport proteins
 – antigens, cd36

– ion channels
 – calcium channels
 – calcium channels, l-type
 – calcium channels, n-type
 – calcium channels, p-type
 – calcium channels, q-type
 – calcium channels, r-type
 – calcium channels, t-type
 – ryanodine receptor calcium release channel
 – trpp cation channels
 – chloride channels
 – cystic fibrosis transmembrane conductance regulator
 – porins
 – aquaporins
 – aquaglyceroporins
 – aquaporin 3
 – aquaporin 6
 – aquaporin 1
 – aquaporin 2
 – aquaporin 4
 – aquaporin 5
 – voltage-dependent anion channels
 – voltage-dependent anion channel 1
 – voltage-dependent anion channel 2
 – potassium channels
 – potassium channels, calcium-activated
 – intermediate-conductance calcium-activated potassium channels
 – large-conductance calcium-activated potassium channels
 – large-conductance calcium-activated potassium channel alpha subunits
 – large-conductance calcium-activated potassium channel beta subunits
 – small-conductance calcium-activated potassium channels
 – potassium channels, inwardly rectifying
 – g protein-coupled inwardly-rectifying potassium channels
 – potassium channels, tandem pore domain
 – potassium channels, voltage-gated
 – delayed rectifier potassium channels
 – kcnq potassium channels
 – kcnq1 potassium channel
 – kcnq2 potassium channel
 – kcnq3 potassium channel
 – kv1.5 potassium channel
 – shab potassium channels
 – ether-a-go-go potassium channels
 – shaker superfamily of potassium channels
 – kv1.1 potassium channel
 – kv1.2 potassium channel
 – kv1.3 potassium channel
 – kv1.4 potassium channel
 – kv1.5 potassium channel
 – kv1.6 potassium channel
 – shab potassium channels
 – shal potassium channels
 – shaw potassium channels
 – sodium channels
 – transient receptor potential channels
 – trpc cation channels
 – trpm cation channels
 – trpp cation channels

– ion pumps

– anion transport proteins
 – halorhodopsins
 – organic anion transporters
 – dicarboxylic acid transporters
 – monocarboxylic acid transporters
 – organic anion transporters, atp-dependent
 – multidrug resistance-associated proteins
 – p-glycoprotein
 – p-glycoproteins
 – organic anion transporters, sodium-dependent
 – organic anion transporters, sodium-independent
 – organic anion transport polypeptide c
 – organic anion transport protein 1
 – phosphate transport proteins
 – proton-phosphate symporters
 – sodium-phosphate cotransporter proteins
 – sodium-phosphate cotransporter proteins, type i
 – sodium-phosphate cotransporter proteins, type ii
 – sodium-phosphate cotransporter proteins, type iia
 – sodium-phosphate cotransporter proteins, type iib
 – sodium-phosphate cotransporter proteins, type iic
 – sodium-phosphate cotransporter proteins, type iii

– antiporters
 – anion exchange protein 1, erythrocyte
 – chloride-bicarbonate antiporters
 – anion exchange protein 1, erythrocyte
 – organic anion transport protein 1
 – mitochondrial adp, atp translocases
 – adenine nucleotide translocator 1
 – adenine nucleotide translocator 2
 – adenine nucleotide translocator 3
 – potassium-hydrogen antiporters
 – sodium-calcium exchanger
 – sodium-hydrogen antiporter
 – vesicular neurotransmitter transport proteins
 – vesicular biogenic amine transport proteins
 – vesicular acetylcholine transport proteins
 – vesicular monoamine transport proteins
 – vesicular glutamate transport proteins
 – vesicular glutamate transport protein 1
 – vesicular glutamate transport protein 2
 – vesicular inhibitory amino acid transport proteins

– cation transport proteins
 – ca(2+)-transporting atpase
 – na(+)-k(+)-exchanging atpase
 – organic cation transport proteins
 – organic cation transporter 1
 – proton pumps
 – bacteriorhodopsins
 – cytochrome b6f complex
 – cytochromes b6
 – cytochromes f
 – plastoquinol-plastocyanin reductase
 – inorganic pyrophosphatase
 – electron transport complex i
 – electron transport complex iii
 – electron transport complex iv
 – photosystem i protein complex
 – proton-translocating atpases
 – bacterial proton-translocating atpases
 – chloroplast proton-translocating atpases
 – h(+)-k(+)-exchanging atpase
 – mitochondrial proton-translocating atpases
 – vacuolar proton-translocating atpases

– symporters
 – dopamine plasma membrane transport proteins
 – gaba plasma membrane transport proteins
 – glutamate plasma membrane transport proteins
 – excitatory amino acid transporter 1
 – excitatory amino acid transporter 2
 – excitatory amino acid transporter 3
 – excitatory amino acid transporter 4
 – excitatory amino acid transporter 5
 – glycine plasma membrane transport proteins
 – norepinephrine plasma membrane transport proteins
 – proton-phosphate symporters
 – serotonin plasma membrane transport proteins
 – sodium-bicarbonate symporters
 – sodium-glucose transport proteins
 – sodium-glucose transporter 1
 – sodium-glucose transporter 2
 – sodium-phosphate cotransporter proteins
 – sodium-phosphate cotransporter proteins, type i
 – sodium-phosphate cotransporter proteins, type ii
 – sodium-phosphate cotransporter proteins, type iia
 – sodium-phosphate cotransporter proteins, type iib
 – sodium-phosphate cotransporter proteins, type iic
 – sodium-phosphate cotransporter proteins, type iii
 – sodium-potassium-chloride symporters

– mitochondrial membrane transport proteins

– monosaccharide transport proteins
 – glucose transport proteins, facilitative
 – glucose transporter type 1
 – glucose transporter type 2
 – glucose transporter type 3
 – glucose transporter type 4
 – glucose transporter type 5
 – sodium-glucose transport proteins
 – sodium-glucose transporter 1
 – sodium-glucose transporter 2

– neurotransmitter transport proteins
 – plasma membrane neurotransmitter transport proteins
 – catecholamine plasma membrane transport proteins
 – dopamine plasma membrane transport proteins
 – norepinephrine plasma membrane transport proteins
 – gaba plasma membrane transport proteins
 – glutamate plasma membrane transport proteins
 – excitatory amino acid transporter 1
 – excitatory amino acid transporter 2
 – excitatory amino acid transporter 3
 – excitatory amino acid transporter 4
 – excitatory amino acid transporter 5
 – glycine plasma membrane transport proteins
 – serotonin plasma membrane transport proteins
 – vesicular neurotransmitter transport proteins
 – vesicular biogenic amine transport proteins
 – vesicular acetylcholine transport proteins
 – vesicular monoamine transport proteins
 – vesicular glutamate transport proteins
 – vesicular glutamate transport protein 1
 – vesicular glutamate transport protein 2
 – vesicular inhibitory amino acid transport proteins

– nucleobase, nucleoside, nucleotide, and nucleic acid transport proteins
 – nucleobase transport proteins
 – nucleoside transport proteins
 – equilibrative nucleoside transport proteins
 – equilibrative nucleoside transporter 1
 – equilibrative-nucleoside transporter 2
 – nucleotide transport proteins
 – mitochondrial adp, atp translocases
 – adenine nucleotide translocator 1
 – adenine nucleotide translocator 2
 – adenine nucleotide translocator 3

– nucleocytoplasmic transport proteins
 – aryl hydrocarbon receptor nuclear translocator
 – cellular apoptosis susceptibility protein
 – karyopherins
 – alpha karyopherins
 – beta karyopherins
 – nuclear pore complex proteins
 – ran gtp-binding protein

– myelin proteins

– myelin-associated glycoprotein

– myelin basic proteins
 – myelin p2 protein

– myelin p0 protein

– myelin proteolipid protein

– neurofibromin 2

– phospholipid transfer proteins

– protoporphyrinogen oxidase

– pulmonary surfactant-associated protein b

– pulmonary surfactant-associated protein c

– receptors, cell surface

– antigens, cd36

– asialoglycoprotein receptor

– autoreceptors

– frizzled receptors

– neuropilins
 – neuropilin-1
 – neuropilin-2

– receptor protein-tyrosine kinases
 – fms-like tyrosine kinase 3
 – receptor, fibroblast growth factor, type 1
 – receptor, fibroblast growth factor, type 2
 – receptor, fibroblast growth factor, type 3
 – receptor, fibroblast growth factor, type 4
 – proto-oncogene proteins c-kit
 – proto-oncogene proteins c-met
 – proto-oncogene proteins c-ret
 – receptor, epidermal growth factor
 – receptor, erbb-2
 – receptor, erbb-3
 – receptor, igf type 1
 – receptor, insulin
 – receptor, macrophage colony-stimulating factor
 – receptor, trka
 – receptor, trkb
 – receptor, trkc
 – receptors, eph family
 – receptor, epha1
 – receptor, epha2
 – receptor, epha3
 – receptor, epha4
 – receptor, epha5
 – receptor, epha6
 – receptor, epha7
 – receptor, epha8
 – receptor, ephb1
 – receptor, ephb2
 – receptor, ephb3
 – receptor, ephb4
 – receptor, ephb5
 – receptor, ephb6
 – receptors, platelet-derived growth factor
 – receptor, platelet-derived growth factor alpha
 – receptor, platelet-derived growth factor beta
 – receptors, tie
 – receptor, tie-1
 – receptor, tie-2
 – receptors, vascular endothelial growth factor
 – vascular endothelial growth factor receptor-1
 – vascular endothelial growth factor receptor 2
 – vascular endothelial growth factor receptor-3

– receptors, biogenic amine
 – receptors, catecholamine
 – receptors, adrenergic
 – receptors, adrenergic, alpha
 – receptors, adrenergic, alpha-1
 – receptors, adrenergic, alpha-2
 – receptors, adrenergic, beta
 – receptors, adrenergic, beta-1
 – receptors, adrenergic, beta-2
 – receptors, adrenergic, beta-3
 – receptors, dopamine
 – receptors, dopamine d1
 – receptors, dopamine d5
 – receptors, dopamine d2
 – receptors, dopamine d3
 – receptors, dopamine d4
 – receptors, histamine
 – receptors, histamine h1
 – receptors, histamine h2
 – receptors, histamine h3
 – receptors, serotonin
 – receptors, serotonin, 5-ht1
 – receptor, serotonin, 5-ht1a
 – receptor, serotonin, 5-ht1b
 – receptor, serotonin, 5-ht1d
 – receptors, serotonin, 5-ht2
 – receptor, serotonin, 5-ht2a
 – receptor, serotonin, 5-ht2b
 – receptor, serotonin, 5-ht2c
 – receptors, serotonin, 5-ht3
 – receptors, serotonin, 5-ht4

– receptors, collagen
 – integrin alpha1beta1
 – integrin alpha2beta1
 – integrin alpha3beta1

– receptors, eicosanoid
 – receptors, leukotriene
 – receptors, leukotriene b4
 – receptors, lipoxin
 – receptors, prostaglandin
 – receptors, epoprostenol
 – receptors, prostaglandin e
 – receptors, thromboxane a2, prostaglandin h2
 – receptors, thromboxane
 – receptors, thromboxane a2, prostaglandin h2

– receptors, g-protein-coupled

– receptor, anaphylatoxin c5a

– receptor, par-2

– receptors, angiotensin
 – receptor, angiotensin, type 1
 – receptor, angiotensin, type 2

– receptors, bombesin

– receptors, bradykinin
 – receptor, bradykinin b1
 – receptor, bradykinin b2

– receptors, calcitonin

– receptors, calcitonin gene-related peptide

– receptors, calcium-sensing

– receptors, cannabinoid
 – receptor, cannabinoid, cb1
 – receptor, cannabinoid, cb2

– receptors, catecholamine
 – receptors, adrenergic
 – receptors, adrenergic, alpha
 – receptors, adrenergic, alpha-1
 – receptors, adrenergic, alpha-2
 – receptors, adrenergic, beta
 – receptors, adrenergic, beta-1
 – receptors, adrenergic, beta-2
 – receptors, adrenergic, beta-3
 – receptors, dopamine
 – receptors, dopamine d1
 – receptors, dopamine d5
 – receptors, dopamine d2
 – receptors, dopamine d3
 – receptors, dopamine d4

– receptors, chemokine
 – receptors, ccr5
 – receptors, cxcr4
 – receptors, interleukin-8a

– receptors, cholecystokinin
 – receptor, cholecystokinin a
 – receptor, cholecystokinin b

– receptors, corticotropin-releasing hormone

– receptors, eicosanoid
 – receptors, leukotriene
 – receptors, leukotriene b4
 – receptors, prostaglandin
 – receptors, epoprostenol
 – receptors, prostaglandin e
 – receptors, thromboxane a2, prostaglandin h2
 – receptors, thromboxane
 – receptors, thromboxane a2, prostaglandin h2

– receptors, endothelin
 – receptor, endothelin a
 – receptor, endothelin b

– receptors, formyl peptide

– receptors, fsh

– receptors, gaba-b

– receptors, galanin
 – receptor, galanin, type 1
 – receptor, galanin, type 2
 – receptor, galanin, type 3

– receptors, glucagon

– receptors, histamine h1

– receptors, histamine h2

– receptors, interleukin-8a

– receptors, interleukin-8b

– receptors, lh

– receptors, lhrh

– receptors, lysophospholipid
 – receptors, lysophosphatidic acid
 – receptors, lysosphingolipid

– receptors, melanocortin
 – receptor, melanocortin, type 1
 – receptor, melanocortin, type 2
 – receptor, melanocortin, type 3
 – receptor, melanocortin, type 4

– receptors, melatonin
 – receptor, melatonin, mt1
 – receptor, melatonin, mt2

– receptors, metabotropic glutamate

– receptors, muscarinic
 – receptor, muscarinic m1
 – receptor, muscarinic m2
 – receptor, muscarinic m3
 – receptor, muscarinic m4
 – receptor, muscarinic m5

– receptors, neuropeptide y

– receptors, neurotensin

– receptors, odorant

– receptors, opioid
 – receptors, opioid, delta
 – receptors, opioid, kappa
 – receptors, opioid, mu
 – receptors, sigma

– receptors, oxytocin

– receptors, parathyroid hormone
 – receptor, parathyroid hormone, type 1
 – receptor, parathyroid hormone, type 2

– receptors, pheromone
 – receptors, mating factor

– receptors, pituitary adenylate cyclase-activating polypeptide
 – receptors, pituitary adenylate cyclase-activating polypeptide, type i
 – receptors, vasoactive intestinal peptide, type ii
 – receptors, vasoactive intestinal polypeptide, type i

– receptors, purinergic
 – receptors, cyclic amp
 – receptors, purinergic p1
 – receptor, adenosine a1
 – receptors, adenosine a2
 – receptor, adenosine a2a
 – receptor, adenosine a2b
 – receptor, adenosine a3
 – receptors, purinergic p2

– receptors, serotonin
 – receptors, serotonin, 5-ht1
 – receptor, serotonin, 5-ht1a
 – receptor, serotonin, 5-ht1b
 – receptor, serotonin, 5-ht1d
 – receptors, serotonin, 5-ht2
 – receptor, serotonin, 5-ht2a
 – receptor, serotonin, 5-ht2b
 – receptor, serotonin, 5-ht2c
 – receptors, serotonin, 5-ht4

– receptors, somatostatin

– receptors, thrombin
 – receptor, par-1

– receptors, vasoactive intestinal peptide
 – receptors, vasoactive intestinal peptide, type ii
 – receptors, vasoactive intestinal polypeptide, type i

– receptors, vasopressin

– rhodopsin

– receptors, guanylate cyclase-coupled
 – receptors, atrial natriuretic factor

– receptors, immunologic

– antigens, cd14

– immunophilins
 – cyclophilins
 – tacrolimus binding proteins
 – tacrolimus binding protein 1a

– integrins
 – integrin alpha chains
 – antigens, cd11a
 – antigens, cd11b
 – antigens, cd11c
 – integrin alpha1
 – integrin alpha2
 – integrin alpha3
 – integrin alpha4
 – integrin alpha5
 – integrin alpha6
 – integrin alphav
 – platelet membrane glycoprotein iib
 – integrin beta chains
 – antigens, cd18
 – antigens, cd29
 – integrin beta3
 – integrin beta4
 – receptors, cytoadhesin
 – integrin alpha6beta4
 – platelet glycoprotein gpiib-iiia complex
 – receptors, vitronectin
 – integrin alphavbeta3
 – receptors, fibrinogen
 – macrophage-1 antigen
 – receptors, fibronectin
 – integrin alpha2beta1
 – integrin alpha4beta1
 – integrin alpha5beta1
 – receptors, leukocyte-adhesion
 – integrin alphaxbeta2
 – lymphocyte function-associated antigen-1
 – macrophage-1 antigen
 – receptors, very late antigen
 – integrin alpha1beta1
 – integrin alpha2beta1
 – integrin alpha3beta1
 – integrin alpha4beta1
 – integrin alpha5beta1
 – integrin alpha6beta1
 – receptors, vitronectin

– platelet membrane glycoproteins
 – antigens, cd36
 – integrin alpha2beta1
 – integrin alpha5beta1
 – integrin alpha6beta1
 – integrin alphavbeta3
 – lysosomal-associated membrane protein 1
 – platelet glycoprotein gpib-ix complex
 – platelet glycoprotein gpiib-iiia complex

– receptors, antigen
 – receptors, antigen, b-cell
 – antigens, cd79
 – receptors, antigen, t-cell
 – antigens, cd28
 – complementarity determining regions
 – receptor-cd3 complex, antigen, t-cell
 – receptors, antigen, t-cell, alpha-beta
 – receptors, antigen, t-cell, gamma-delta

– receptors, complement
 – antigens, cd46
 – integrin alphaxbeta2
 – macrophage-1 antigen
 – receptor, anaphylatoxin c5a
 – receptors, complement 3b
 – receptors, complement 3d

– receptors, cytokine
 – cytokine receptor gp130
 – receptors, chemokine
 – receptors, ccr5
 – receptors, cxcr4
 – receptors, interleukin-8a
 – receptors, colony-stimulating factor
 – proto-oncogene proteins c-kit
 – receptor, macrophage colony-stimulating factor
 – receptors, erythropoietin
 – receptors, granulocyte colony-stimulating factor
 – receptors, granulocyte-macrophage colony-stimulating factor
 – receptors, interleukin-3
 – receptors, interferon
 – receptors, interleukin
 – receptors, interleukin-1
 – receptors, interleukin-2
 – receptors, interleukin-3
 – receptors, interleukin-4
 – receptors, interleukin-6
 – receptors, interleukin-7
 – receptors, interleukin-8a
 – receptors, interleukin-8b
 – receptors, transforming growth factor beta
 – receptors, tumor necrosis factor
 – antigens, cd27
 – antigens, cd30
 – antigens, cd40
 – antigens, cd95
 – receptors, tumor necrosis factor, type i
 – receptors, tumor necrosis factor, type ii

– receptors, fc
 – receptors, ige
 – receptors, igg
 – receptors, polymeric immunoglobulin

– receptors, formyl peptide

– receptors, laminin
 – integrin alpha1beta1
 – integrin alpha2beta1
 – integrin alpha3beta1
 – integrin alpha5beta1
 – integrin alpha6beta1
 – integrin alpha6beta4

– receptors, lymphocyte homing
 – antigens, cd44
 – integrin alpha4beta1
 – lymphocyte function-associated antigen-1
 – l-selectin

– receptors, mitogen
 – receptors, concanavalin a

– receptors, pattern recognition
 – toll-like receptors
 – toll-like receptor 1
 – toll-like receptor 2
 – toll-like receptor 3
 – toll-like receptor 4
 – toll-like receptor 5
 – toll-like receptor 6
 – toll-like receptor 7
 – toll-like receptor 8
 – toll-like receptor 9
 – toll-like receptor 10

– receptors, scavenger
 – scavenger receptors, class a
 – scavenger receptors, class b
 – antigens, cd36
 – scavenger receptors, class c
 – scavenger receptors, class d
 – scavenger receptors, class e
 – scavenger receptors, class f

– receptors, lipoprotein
 – receptors, ldl
 – ldl-receptor related proteins
 – ldl-receptor related protein 1
 – ldl-receptor related protein 2
 – receptors, oxidized ldl
 – scavenger receptors, class e
 – receptors, scavenger
 – scavenger receptors, class a
 – scavenger receptors, class b
 – antigens, cd36
 – scavenger receptors, class c
 – scavenger receptors, class d
 – scavenger receptors, class e
 – scavenger receptors, class f

– receptors, n-acetylglucosamine

– receptors, neurotransmitter
 – receptors, amino acid
 – receptors, gaba
 – receptors, gaba-a
 – receptors, gaba-b
 – receptors, glutamate
 – receptors, ampa
 – receptors, kainic acid
 – receptors, metabotropic glutamate
 – receptors, n-methyl-d-aspartate
 – receptors, glycine
 – receptors, biogenic amine
 – receptors, catecholamine
 – receptors, adrenergic
 – receptors, adrenergic, alpha
 – receptors, adrenergic, alpha-1
 – receptors, adrenergic, alpha-2
 – receptors, adrenergic, beta
 – receptors, adrenergic, beta-1
 – receptors, adrenergic, beta-2
 – receptors, adrenergic, beta-3
 – receptors, dopamine
 – receptors, dopamine d1
 – receptors, dopamine d5
 – receptors, dopamine d2
 – receptors, dopamine d3
 – receptors, dopamine d4
 – receptors, histamine
 – receptors, histamine h1
 – receptors, histamine h2
 – receptors, histamine h3
 – receptors, serotonin
 – receptors, serotonin, 5-ht1
 – receptor, serotonin, 5-ht1a
 – receptor, serotonin, 5-ht1b
 – receptor, serotonin, 5-ht1d
 – receptors, serotonin, 5-ht2
 – receptor, serotonin, 5-ht2a
 – receptor, serotonin, 5-ht2b
 – receptor, serotonin, 5-ht2c
 – receptors, serotonin, 5-ht3
 – receptors, serotonin, 5-ht4
 – receptors, cholinergic
 – receptors, muscarinic
 – receptor, muscarinic m1
 – receptor, muscarinic m2
 – receptor, muscarinic m3
 – receptor, muscarinic m4
 – receptor, muscarinic m5
 – receptors, nicotinic
 – receptors, neuropeptide
 – receptors, angiotensin
 – receptor, angiotensin, type 1
 – receptor, angiotensin, type 2
 – receptors, atrial natriuretic factor
 – receptors, bombesin
 – receptors, bradykinin
 – receptor, bradykinin b1
 – receptor, bradykinin b2
 – receptors, calcitonin
 – receptors, calcitonin gene-related peptide
 – receptors, cholecystokinin
 – receptor, cholecystokinin a
 – receptor, cholecystokinin b
 – receptors, corticotropin
 – receptors, melanocortin
 – receptor, melanocortin, type 1
 – receptor, melanocortin, type 2
 – receptor, melanocortin, type 3
 – receptor, melanocortin, type 4
 – receptors, corticotropin-releasing hormone
 – receptors, fsh
 – receptors, galanin
 – receptors, lh
 – receptors, lhrh
 – receptors, neuropeptide y
 – receptors, neurotensin
 – receptors, opioid
 – receptors, opioid, delta
 – receptors, opioid, kappa
 – receptors, opioid, mu
 – receptors, sigma
 – receptors, oxytocin
 – receptors, prolactin
 – receptors, somatostatin
 – receptors, tachykinin
 – receptors, neurokinin-1
 – receptors, neurokinin-2
 – receptors, neurokinin-3
 – receptors, thyrotropin
 – receptors, thyrotropin-releasing hormone
 – receptors, vasoactive intestinal peptide
 – receptors, vasopressin
 – receptors, presynaptic
 – autoreceptors
 – receptor, serotonin, 5-ht1b
 – receptor, serotonin, 5-ht1d
 – receptors, purinergic
 – receptors, cyclic amp
 – receptors, purinergic p1
 – receptor, adenosine a1
 – receptors, adenosine a2
 – receptor, adenosine a2a
 – receptor, adenosine a2b
 – receptor, adenosine a3
 – receptors, purinergic p2

– receptors, notch
 – receptor, notch1
 – receptor, notch2

– receptors, odorant

– receptors, peptide

– receptors, albumin

– receptors, angiotensin
 – receptor, angiotensin, type 1
 – receptor, angiotensin, type 2

– receptors, atrial natriuretic factor

– receptors, calcitonin

– receptors, endothelin
 – receptor, endothelin a
 – receptor, endothelin b

– receptors, formyl peptide

– receptors, gastrointestinal hormone
 – receptors, cholecystokinin
 – receptor, cholecystokinin a
 – receptor, cholecystokinin b
 – receptor, epidermal growth factor
 – receptors, vasoactive intestinal peptide

– receptors, growth factor
 – bone morphogenetic protein receptors
 – bone morphogenetic protein receptors, type i
 – bone morphogenetic protein receptors, type ii
 – proto-oncogene proteins c-met
 – receptors, colony-stimulating factor
 – proto-oncogene proteins c-kit
 – receptor, macrophage colony-stimulating factor
 – receptors, erythropoietin
 – receptors, granulocyte colony-stimulating factor
 – receptors, granulocyte-macrophage colony-stimulating factor
 – receptors, interleukin-3
 – receptor, epidermal growth factor
 – receptor, erbb-2
 – receptor, erbb-3
 – receptors, fibroblast growth factor
 – receptor, fibroblast growth factor, type 1
 – receptor, fibroblast growth factor, type 2
 – receptor, fibroblast growth factor, type 3
 – receptor, fibroblast growth factor, type 4
 – receptor, fibroblast growth factor, type 5
 – receptors, nerve growth factor
 – glial cell line-derived neurotrophic factor receptors
 – receptor, ciliary neurotrophic factor
 – receptor, nerve growth factor
 – receptor, trka
 – receptor, trkb
 – receptor, trkc
 – receptors, platelet-derived growth factor
 – receptor, platelet-derived growth factor alpha
 – receptor, platelet-derived growth factor beta
 – receptors, somatomedin
 – receptor, igf type 1
 – receptor, igf type 2
 – receptors, transforming growth factor beta
 – activin receptors
 – activin receptors, type i
 – activin receptors, type ii
 – receptors, vascular endothelial growth factor
 – vascular endothelial growth factor receptor-1
 – vascular endothelial growth factor receptor 2
 – vascular endothelial growth factor receptor-3

– receptors, invertebrate peptide

– receptors, neuropeptide
 – receptors, angiotensin
 – receptor, angiotensin, type 1
 – receptor, angiotensin, type 2
 – receptors, atrial natriuretic factor
 – receptors, bombesin
 – receptors, bradykinin
 – receptor, bradykinin b1
 – receptor, bradykinin b2
 – receptors, calcitonin
 – receptors, calcitonin gene-related peptide
 – receptors, cholecystokinin
 – receptor, cholecystokinin a
 – receptor, cholecystokinin b
 – receptors, corticotropin
 – receptors, melanocortin
 – receptor, melanocortin, type 1
 – receptor, melanocortin, type 2
 – receptor, melanocortin, type 3
 – receptor, melanocortin, type 4
 – receptors, corticotropin-releasing hormone
 – receptors, fsh
 – receptors, galanin
 – receptors, lh
 – receptors, lhrh
 – receptors, neuropeptide y
 – receptors, neurotensin
 – receptors, opioid
 – receptors, opioid, delta
 – receptors, opioid, kappa
 – receptors, opioid, mu
 – receptors, sigma
 – receptors, oxytocin
 – receptors, prolactin
 – receptors, somatostatin
 – receptors, somatotropin
 – receptors, tachykinin
 – receptors, neurokinin-1
 – receptors, neurokinin-2
 – receptors, neurokinin-3
 – receptors, thyrotropin
 – receptors, thyrotropin-releasing hormone
 – receptors, vasoactive intestinal peptide
 – receptors, vasopressin

– receptors, pancreatic hormone
 – receptor, insulin
 – receptors, glucagon
 – receptors, somatostatin

– receptors, parathyroid hormone
 – receptor, parathyroid hormone, type 1
 – receptor, parathyroid hormone, type 2

– receptors, pituitary hormone
 – receptors, corticotropin
 – receptors, melanocortin
 – receptor, melanocortin, type 1
 – receptor, melanocortin, type 2
 – receptor, melanocortin, type 3
 – receptor, melanocortin, type 4
 – receptors, gonadotropin
 – receptors, fsh
 – receptors, lh
 – receptors, prolactin
 – receptors, oxytocin
 – receptors, somatotropin
 – receptors, thyrotropin
 – receptors, vasopressin

– receptors, pituitary hormone-regulating hormone
 – receptors, corticotropin-releasing hormone
 – receptors, lhrh
 – receptors, somatostatin
 – receptors, thyrotropin-releasing hormone

– receptors, thrombin
 – receptor, par-1
 – thrombomodulin

– receptors, pheromone
 – receptors, mating factor

– receptors, proteinase-activated
 – receptor, par-2
 – receptors, thrombin
 – receptor, par-1

– receptors, purinergic
 – receptors, cyclic amp
 – receptors, purinergic p1
 – receptor, adenosine a1
 – receptors, adenosine a2
 – receptor, adenosine a2a
 – receptor, adenosine a2b
 – receptor, adenosine a3
 – receptors, purinergic p2

– receptors, transferrin
 – bacterial transferrin receptor complex
 – transferrin-binding protein a
 – transferrin-binding protein b

– receptors, virus
 – receptors, complement 3d
 – receptors, hiv
 – antigens, cd4
 – receptors, ccr5
 – receptors, cxcr4

– spectrin

– utrophin

– vesicular transport proteins

– auxilins

– caveolins
 – caveolin 1
 – caveolin 2
 – caveolin 3

– adaptor proteins, vesicular transport
 – adaptor protein complex 1
 – adaptor protein complex 2
 – adaptor protein complex 3
 – adaptor protein complex 4
 – adaptor protein complex subunits
 – adaptor protein complex alpha subunits
 – adaptor protein complex beta subunits
 – adaptor protein complex delta subunits
 – adaptor protein complex gamma subunits
 – adaptor protein complex mu subunits
 – adaptor protein complex sigma subunits
 – monomeric clathrin assembly proteins

– clathrin
 – clathrin heavy chains
 – clathrin light chains

– coat protein complex i
 – ADP-ribosylation factor 1
 – coatomer protein

– dynamins
 – dynamin i
 – dynamin ii
 – dynamin iii

– munc18 proteins

– snare proteins
 – q-snare proteins
 – qa-snare proteins
 – syntaxin 1
 – syntaxin 16
 – qb-snare proteins
 – synaptosomal-associated protein 25
 – qc-snare proteins
 – synaptosomal-associated protein 25
 – r-snare proteins
 – vesicle-associated membrane protein 1
 – vesicle-associated membrane protein 2
 – vesicle-associated membrane protein 3

– soluble n-ethylmaleimide-sensitive factor attachment proteins

– synaptotagmins
 – synaptotagmin i
 – synaptotagmin ii

The list continues at List of MeSH codes (D12.776) § MeSH D12.776.556.

D12.776.543